The 1978 UNLV Rebels football team was an American football team that represented the University of Nevada, Las Vegas as an independent during the 1978 NCAA Division I-A football season. In their third year under head coach Tony Knap, the team compiled a 7–4 record.

Schedule

References

UNLV
UNLV Rebels football seasons
UNLV Rebels football